The Council for a Beautiful Israel (CBI)  is a public non-profit organization focused on improving the quality of life in Israel. CBI was Israel's first environmental association.

History
The Council for a Beautiful Israel was founded in 1968 by the Interior Committee of the Knesset and Aura Herzog, who served as its international president. CBI oversees environmental awareness programs,  environmental action on a national and local level, green urban projects and competitions revolving around environmental awareness.

In 2010, work began on a new environmental and educational center in Kiryat HaLeom, Jerusalem.
Most of the Council's work is carried out by volunteers, including children, who are known as the 'Guardians of a Beautiful Israel'.

Awards 
The Yakir Award is awarded every year by the President of Israel for an outstanding contribution to the Jewish community in Israel and the Diaspora, especially in environmental issues and the preservation of quality of life in Israel. .

References

External links

 The Council for a beautiful Israel
About the Council for a Beautiful Israel
The Council for a Beautiful Israel Projects

Nature conservation in Israel